The Movimiento Tour was the eleventh tour by Puerto Rican recording artist Ricky Martin, in support of his eleventh studio album, which was set to be called Movimiento (2020). The tour began in San Juan, Puerto Rico at the José Miguel Agrelot Coliseum on February 7, 2020.  Owing to the COVID-19 pandemic, more than half of the scheduled dates were canceled.  Also because of the pandemic and subsequent personal experiences, Martin decided to split the tour's associated album in two extended plays, Pausa and Play; the former was released on May 29, 2020, and the latter is expected to be released in September 2020.

Setlist
The following setlist was obtained from the February 7, 2020 concert, held at the José Miguel Agrelot Coliseum in San Juan, Puerto Rico. It does not represent all concerts during the duration of the tour.
"Cántalo"
"La Bomba"
"Isla Bella"
"Bombón de Azúcar"
"Tiburones"
"Livin' la Vida Loca"
"Loaded"
"Shake Your Bon-Bon"
"Fuego Contra Fuego"
"Fuego de Noche, Nieve de Día"
"Te Extraño, Te Olvido, Te Amo"
"Tu Recuerdo"
"Lola, Lola"
"She Bangs"
"Nobody Wants to Be Lonely"
"Vuelve"
"Pégate"
"La Mordidita"
"María"
"The Cup of Life"
"Vente Pa' Ca"

Shows

Cancelled shows

Notes

References

External links
Ricky Martin Official Website

Ricky Martin concert tours
2020 concert tours